Germany Kent is an American print and broadcast journalist, television personality, former beauty queen, actor, businesswoman, producer, philanthropist, and author. Her work has appeared in INC. Magazine, Fast Company, Forbes, Bloomberg Business, MSN South Africa, Yahoo Canada, Cosmopolitan (UK), and The Dallas Morning News. Her media appearances include NPR, AOL.com, and ABC.

Early life
Born in Greenville, Mississippi, Kent (born Evelyn Palmer) is the daughter of Lula Palmer, a businesswoman and politician, and Charles Palmer, a retired school administrator and disc jockey. She graduated from North Panola High School in Sardis, Mississippi.  In 2017, Kent became the first woman to be inducted into the North Panola Hall of Fame.

Education
After graduating from North Panola High School, Kent entered Northwest Mississippi Community College in Senatobia where she majored in Journalism and Public Relations.  While at Northwest, Kent became the first African-American to be elected president of the Student Senate. She transferred to Mississippi State University in Starkville where she earned a Bachelor's Degree. While at Mississippi State, Kent was the first African-American woman to be elected to the Student Association, serving as the Attorney General. She is an alumna of the University of Alabama, and the University of Southern California.

Journalism

Print
Kent has written on issues central to social media branding and offering ways to use social media for marketing, social media ethics, business etiquette and social media etiquette. Kent's work has been published in Forbes, Yahoo News, HuffPost, Parade Magazine, Cosmopolitan, AOL, MSN, Monster.com, St. Louis Post-Dispatch, Southern Living, Parade, and various others.

Arts and entertainment
Kent served as a freelance reporter in Los Angeles and has covered hard news, politics, sports, entertainment, award ceremonies and red carpet events. She has worked as a radio personality in Los Angeles and anchor for public affairs television. She has covered entertainment for a community magazine as a reporter in Atlanta.  In September 2013, Kent founded her own multi-platform media startup. She became one of the executive producers, for which she serves as a consultant, and guest on-air talent. She has been involved in television and radio as a media pundit. It was announced in October 2015 that Kent was joining the news team at the 50 Plus Report as a producer, reporter, and host. The outlet covered news features airing on KPTS-TV, the PBS affiliate station in Wichita, KS covering a variety of topics from technology to finance, business, health, fashion, beauty, travel, entertainment, and human interest stories. Kent anchored the nightly news for the FOX affiliate KARD 14 myarklamiss in Louisiana, and has served as a freelance reporter and host for various other media outlets.

In 2013, Kent was a guest correspondent for Real TV Films when she worked the Celebrity World Challenge Golf Championship in Calabasas, California benefiting ProCon.org and The March of Dimes.

While based in Los Angeles, Kent won the Sigma Delta Chi Award for Online Deadline Reporting (Independent) for the story "Tragedy in Thousand Oaks," coverage in the wake of the Thousand Oaks shooting on the night of November 7, 2018.

In June 2019, she was honored for distinguished service to the American people and the profession of journalism through outstanding accomplishments in the field for excellence in journalism by the Society of Professional Journalists at the National Press Club in Washington, D.C.

Acting
Kent has made numerous acting appearances as a cameo or playing an on-screen character. She has had a number of nationally broadcast television commercials, with spots for NIKE, Verizon, Carrier, and Coors Light, in addition to a variety of other advertisements for AT&T, 
Target, Pepsi, Budweiser, eHarmony, and others. Kent has also starred in numerous advertisements for Disney, including those for Disney Destinations, Disney Aulani Resort, and the Disneyland Resort in California. She has also provided voice-over work for the Disney brand. In 2012, Kent appeared as a winning contestant on Let's Make a Deal Christmas Edition. That same year she appeared in a guest starring role as a crack addict on the USA Network television series Graceland. In 2013, Kent starred in a Reality-TV series for the Food Network, alongside celebrity chef Robert Irvine. Kent has appeared on The Doctors, Criminal Minds, and The Real Housewives of Atlanta.

Music video appearances
In 2012, Kent made an appearance alongside singer-songwriter Mary J. Blige in her video "Why."  In 2011, Kent made an appearance alongside musical group Take 6 for their video "One," which also featured pop icon Stevie Wonder.

Pageants
Kent represented Tennessee in the 1991 Hal Jackson Talented Teens International pageant held in New York City.  She won the "Miss Personality Award" from over 120 contestants representing countries from all around the world. In an infamous pageant moment, Kent was kissed onstage by Shawn Stockman, of Boyz II Men, during her crowning. In 1992, her stage performance garnered her a place among the Top 10 at the Miss Teen Mississippi Pageant. She also won her state's Speech Award at the pageant that same year.

In 1993, Kent placed in the Top 5 at the Miss Teen Mississippi Pageant, and won the Speech Award for the second consecutive year while also walking away with the "Miss Congeniality Award." 
While at Mississippi State, Kent won the Miss Alpha Phi Alpha Pageant and was featured in their 12-month calendar as Miss July 1997.

Author
In March 2015, Kent penned a book on hope and motivation, The Hope Handbook. The book was originally created as a book of tweets from inspirations that Kent had posted on social media site Twitter. Kent claimed to have received hundreds of messages from followers recognizing her motivational Twitter messages and explaining how her messages of hope had inspired them. As a response to their messages, a collection of some of the tweets were assembled, and the book came to fruition.

Following the success of The Hope Handbook, Kent released a collection of Hope books, titled The Hope Handbook Series.

In May 2015 Kent released You Are What You Tweet.

In March 2017, You Are What You Tweet received national recognition as one of four books selected by actor Romany Malco to help President Donald Trump with social media etiquette. As part of Malco's campaign, the book was sent to the White House.

In June 2017, Kent teamed up with author and publisher Rhonda Branch Yearby to produce the book Women Of Faith: Their Untold Stories Revealed: Teen Edition: Bully & Cyber Bullying Prevention.

Published works
 You Are What You Tweet: Harness The Power of Twitter to Create a Happier, Healthier Life  
 The Hope Handbook: The Search for Personal Growth 
 The Hope Handbook for Couples: The Search for Personal Growth 
 The Hope Handbook for Moms: The Search for Personal Growth 
 The Hope Handbook for Dads: The Search for Personal Growth 
 The Hope Handbook for Christians: The Search for Personal Growth 
 The Hope Handbook for Singles: The Search for Personal Growth 
 The Hope Handbook for Survivors: The Search for Personal Growth 
 The Hope Handbook for Mentors and Coaches: The Search for Personal Growth 
 The Hope Handbook for Leaders: The Search for Personal Growth 
 Women of Faith Their Untold Stories Revealed: Teen Edition: Bully & Cyber Bullying Prevention

References

American women television producers
Living people
21st-century American journalists
American television reporters and correspondents
21st-century American women writers
African-American television hosts
African-American television producers
African-American women journalists
21st-century American actresses
21st-century American businesspeople
American entertainment industry businesspeople
21st-century American writers
Activists from Mississippi
Actresses from Mississippi
African-American activists
African-American actresses
African-American Christians
African-American journalists
African-American women writers
African-American writers
American beauty pageant winners
American book publishers (people)
American business writers
Women business writers
American Christian writers
American film actresses
American humanitarians
American infotainers
American marketing people
American motivational speakers
American women film producers
Women motivational writers
American online publication editors
American philanthropists
American self-help writers
American television actresses
American voice actresses
American women television journalists
American YouTubers
Female models from Mississippi
Journalists from California
Marketing women
University of Southern California alumni
National Book Award winners
American opinion journalists
University of Alabama alumni
Participants in American reality television series
People from Greenville, Mississippi
Journalists from Mississippi
Mississippi State University alumni
Writers from Mississippi
American motivational writers
American online journalists
Mass media people from California
Social media influencers
21st-century American businesswomen
21st-century African-American women
21st-century African-American people
1975 births